The 2021–22 South Carolina State Bulldogs basketball team represented South Carolina State University in the 2021–22 NCAA Division I men's basketball season. The Bulldogs, led by first-year head coach Tony Madlock, played their home games at SHM Memorial Center in Orangeburg, South Carolina as members of the Mid-Eastern Athletic Conference.

Previous season
The Bulldogs finished the 2020–21 season 1–17, 1–7 in MEAC play to finish in last place in the Southern Division. Since only the top 3 teams from both divisions qualify for the MEAC tournament, they failed to qualify for the tournament.

On March 15, the school announced that head coach Murray Garvin's contract would not be renewed, ending his eight-year tenure with the team. Ten days later, on March 25, the school named Memphis assistant coach Tony Madlock as their next head coach.

Roster

Schedule and results

|-
!colspan=12 style=| Regular season

|-
!colspan=9 style=| MEAC tournament

Sources

References

South Carolina State Bulldogs basketball seasons
South Carolina State Bulldogs
South Carolina State Bulldogs basketball
South Carolina State Bulldogs basketball